Men of San Quentin is a 1942 American film directed by William Beaudine.

Plot

Cast 
J. Anthony Hughes as Jack Holden
Eleanor Stewart as Anne Holden
Dick Curtis as Butch Mason
Charles B. Middleton as Saunderson
Jeffrey Sayre as Jimmy
George P. Breakston as Louie Howard
Art Mills as Big Al
Michael Mark as Mike, Convict in Ravine
John Ince as Board Chairman
Joe Whitehead as Joe Williams
John 'Skins' Miller as Convict Skins Miller
John Shay as Phone Guard
Jack Cheatham as Court Gate Guard
Drew Demorest as Guard Gaines
Nancy Evans as Mrs. Doakes
Ted R. Standish as Prison Department of Music Supervisor Ted R. Standish
John A. Hendricks as Prison Orchestra Conductor John A. Hendricks
G. Rolph Burr as Prison Broadcast Announcer G. Rolph Burr
Jack Reavis as Prison Glee Club Director Jack Reavis
Carl C. Hocker as San Quentin Prison Guard Carl C. Hocker

Soundtrack

External links 
 
 
 
 

1942 crime drama films
1942 films
American action thriller films
American crime drama films
American crime thriller films
American black-and-white films
1940s English-language films
Films directed by William Beaudine
Films set in San Quentin State Prison
American prison films
Producers Releasing Corporation films
1940s American films